Tomasz "Reyash" Rejek (br 5 December 1974) is a Polish black metal musician. He is a bassist, and vocalist known for his contribution to the bands Vader, Supreme Lord, Profanum, Christ Agony, Incantation, and Witchmaster. He graduated in marketing and management at the University of Zielona Góra.

Discography

References

1974 births
Living people
Black metal musicians
Death metal musicians
Vader (band) members
Polish heavy metal singers
English-language singers from Poland
20th-century Polish male singers
21st-century Polish male singers
21st-century Polish singers